The 2002 Saint Francis Red Flash football team represented Saint Francis University as a member of the Northeast Conference (NEC) during the 2002 NCAA Division I-AA football season. The Red Flash were led by Dave Opfar in his first year as the program's 26th head coach. The team played its home games at the Pine Bowl. They finished the season 2–8 overall and 0–7 in NEC play to place last.

Schedule

References

Saint Francis
Saint Francis Red Flash football seasons
Saint Francis Red Flash football